Mount Markham is a twin-peaked massif surmounting the north end of Antarctica's Markham Plateau.

Mount Markham may also refer to:

 Mount Markham (New York)
 Mount Albert Markham

See also
 Markham (disambiguation)